Peter Braun is a West German para-alpine skier. He represented West Germany at alpine skiing at the 1976 Winter Paralympics.

He won the bronze medal at the Men's Giant Slalom IV B event, the only event he competed in.

See also 
 List of Paralympic medalists in alpine skiing

References 

Living people
Year of birth missing (living people)
Place of birth missing (living people)
Paralympic alpine skiers of Germany
Alpine skiers at the 1976 Winter Paralympics
Medalists at the 1976 Winter Paralympics
Paralympic bronze medalists for West Germany
Paralympic medalists in alpine skiing